Twin Freaks is an album by Twin Freaks, a duo composed of Paul McCartney and Freelance Hellraiser (Roy Kerr), released on 13 June 2005.

History and structure
McCartney and Kerr created the double vinyl album as a continuation of Kerr's collaboration with McCartney from a 2004 tour. Kerr was known at the time for the mash-up album A Stroke of Genius, released in 2002.

Kerr performed a half-hour set prior to McCartney's 2004 gigs in which he remixed various McCartney tracks into unusual and often unrecognizable forms. Twin Freaks was the outgrowth of these manipulations.

All McCartney tracks on the album are strongly revised and reinvented in the process. Who is responsible for what aspects of the works or their reinvention is unclear.

The album was produced as a double vinyl release and a digital download in Windows Media Audio (WMA) format.  The cover features a painting by McCartney, the interior artwork features paintings that are similar in tone and style to artist Willem de Kooning. McCartney knew the late artist, with whom he shared a similar painting style.

"Really Love You", backed with "Lalula", was released as a one-sided 12" single, limited to 500 copies, released on 6 June 2005. A second single, limited to 200 copies, was of "What's that You're Doing" backed with "Rinse the Raindrops".

The album was re-released as a digital download on 24 April 2012 to iTunes and Amazon.

Track listing
All songs written by Paul McCartney, except where noted.

Side one
"Really Love You" (Paul McCartney, Richard Starkey) – 5:42
"Long Haired Lady (Reprise)" (Paul McCartney, Linda McCartney) – 4:50
"Rinse the Raindrops" – 3:14

Side two
"Darkroom" – 2:30
"Live and Let Die" (Paul McCartney, Linda McCartney) – 3:26
"Temporary Secretary" – 4:12

Side three
"What's That You're Doing" (Stevie Wonder, Paul McCartney) – 4:57
"Oh Woman, Oh Why" – 4:19
"Mumbo" (Paul McCartney, Linda McCartney) – 5:24

Side four
"Lalula" – 4:25
"Coming Up" – 4:42
"Maybe I'm Amazed" – 6:12

References

External links
McCartney, Paul. Twin Freaks

2005 remix albums
Paul McCartney albums
Parlophone remix albums
Electronic remix albums
EMI Records remix albums